The men's team standard competition at the 2010 Asian Games in Guangzhou was held from 18 November to 26 November at the Guangzhou Chess Institute.

Schedule
All times are China Standard Time (UTC+08:00)

Results
Legend
GP — Game points
SB — Sonneborn–Berger score
WO — Walkover

Preliminary round

Round 1

Round 2

Round 3

Round 4

Round 5

Round 6

Round 7

Summary

Knockout round

Semifinals

Bronze medal match

Gold medal match

Non-participating athletes

References 

Results

Chess at the 2010 Asian Games